The term dogmatic fact is employed in the teaching of the Catholic Church, to mean any fact connected with a dogma, wherein the application of the dogma is itself what constitutes, or more accurately canonizes, the fact.

For example, if a certain Church council is an ecumenical council then this is connected with dogma, for every ecumenical council is endowed with infallibility and jurisdiction over the Catholic Church; If a Church council is ecumenical then their rendering of documents will be the canon of that document, with natural providence secondary to divine providence. Ecumenical councils can make dogmatic facts.

In a stricter sense, the term dogmatic fact is confined to books and spoken discourses. With this, the ecumenical council example can be made clearer. If an ecumenical council declared a writing unorthodox, even were this not the authors intention and indeed the author made no argument against orthodox, or even if later books having the same teachings were not so declared, the earlier work can nonetheless remain unorthodox on account of how the work was understood (or misunderstood) by wider interpretations. Thus, one purpose of a dogmatic fact is readily seen; a dogmatic fact allows the Catholic Church to arbitrate as to which other churches are Catholic, separate from what those churches themselves claim or believe. Dogmatic facts can also be used in non-dogmatic senses, such as a writer being subversive to canon and duly labelled, despite the writer's own protests.

Catholic Teaching

Profession of Faith 
The Catholic Church clarified that dogmatic facts are taught infallibly in a June 1998 letter from the Congregation for the Doctrine of the Faith (CDF), which was then headed by Joseph Cardinal Ratzinger, later Pope Benedict XVI. "Such doctrines ... [are] taught infallibly by the ordinary and universal Magisterium of the Church as a 'sententia definitive tenenda'. Every believer, therefore, is required to give firm and definitive assent to these truths, based on faith in the Holy Spirit's assistance to the Church's Magisterium, and on the Catholic doctrine of the infallibility of the Magisterium in these matters. Whoever denies these truths would be in a position of rejecting a truth of Catholic doctrine and would therefore no longer be in full communion with the Catholic Church."

The CDF explained that dogmatic facts fall under the second paragraph of the Church's Profession of Faith, which states, "'I also firmly accept and hold each and everything definitively proposed by the Church regarding teaching on faith and morals'. The object taught by this formula includes all those teachings belonging to the dogmatic or moral area, which are necessary for faithfully keeping and expounding the deposit of faith, even if they have not been proposed by the Magisterium of the Church as formally revealed." In discussing "truths connected to revelation by historical necessity and which are to be held definitively, but are not able to be declared as divinely revealed," the letter mentions dogmatic facts in a list of examples: "the legitimacy of the election of the Supreme Pontiff or of the celebration of an ecumenical council, the canonizations of saints (dogmatic facts), [and] the declaration of Pope Leo XIII in the Apostolic Letter Apostolicae Curae on the invalidity of Anglican ordinations."

In his May 1998 motu propio Ad tuendam fidem, Pope John Paul II stated, "This second paragraph of the Profession of faith is of utmost importance since it refers to truths that are necessarily connected to divine revelation. These truths, in the investigation of Catholic doctrine, illustrate the Divine Spirit’s particular inspiration for the Church’s deeper understanding of a truth concerning faith and morals, with which they are connected either for historical reasons or by a logical relationship."

Reasoning 
In the 1998 letter, the CDF offered the following explanation for why dogmatic facts fall under the second paragraph of the Profession of Faith:  "The truths belonging to this second paragraph can be of various natures, thus giving different qualities to their relationship with revelation. There are truths which are necessarily connected with revelation by virtue of an historical relationship, while other truths evince a logical connection that expresses a stage in the maturation of understanding of revelation which the Church is called to undertake. The fact that these doctrines may not be proposed as formally revealed, insofar as they add to the data of faith elements that are not revealed or which are not yet expressly recognized as such, in no way diminishes their definitive character, which is required at least by their intrinsic connection with revealed truth. Moreover, it cannot be excluded that at a certain point in dogmatic development, the understanding of the realities and the words of the deposit of faith can progress in the life of the Church, and the Magisterium may proclaim some of these doctrines as also dogmas of divine and catholic faith. ... Such a doctrine can be confirmed or reaffirmed by the Roman Pontiff, even without recourse to a solemn definition, by declaring explicitly that it belongs to the teaching of the ordinary and universal Magisterium ... as a truth of Catholic doctrine (second paragraph). Consequently, when there has not been a judgement on a doctrine in the solemn form of a definition, but this doctrine, belonging to the inheritance of the depositum fidei, is taught by the ordinary and universal Magisterium, which necessarily includes the Pope, such a doctrine is to be understood as having been set forth infallibly. The declaration of confirmation or reaffirmation by the Roman Pontiff in this case is not a new dogmatic definition, but a formal attestation of a truth already possessed and infallibly transmitted by the Church."

Implications 
While the Catholic Church distinguishes between truths set forth as divinely revealed (doctrines de fide credenda) or to be held definitively (doctrines de fide tenenda), as dogmatic facts are, the Church has stressed:"[T]there is no difference with respect to the full and irrevocable character of the assent which is owed to these teachings. The difference concerns the supernatural virtue of faith: in the case of truths of the first paragraph, the assent is based directly on faith in the authority of the word of God (doctrines de fide credenda); in the case of the truths of the second paragraph, the assent is based on faith in the Holy Spirit's assistance to the Magisterium and on the Catholic doctrine of the infallibility of the Magisterium (doctrines de fide tenenda). ... Every believer, therefore, is required to give firm and definitive assent to these truths, based on faith in the Holy Spirit's assistance to the Church's Magisterium, and on the Catholic doctrine of the infallibility of the Magisterium in these matters. Whoever denies these truths would be in a position of rejecting a truth of Catholic doctrine and would therefore no longer be in full communion with the Catholic Church."

Historical Views
The Catholic Church has always exercised the right of pronouncing with authority on dogmatic facts. However, prior to the 1998 clarifications issued by Pope John Paul II and the Congregation for the Doctrine of the Faith, there was historically confusion and debate about how to understand dogmatic facts.

Jansenism 
Jansenists distinguished between "fact" and "dogma". They held that the Catholic Church is infallible in defining revealed truth and in condemning errors opposed to revealed truth, but that the Church is not infallible in defining facts which are not contained in divine revelation. Consequently they held that the Church was not infallible in declaring that a particular doctrine, in a particular sense, was found in the Augustinus of Jansenius. The more extreme Jansenists, distinguishing between dogma and fact, taught that the dogma is the proper object of faith but that to the definition of fact only respectful silence is due. They refused to subscribe the formula of the condemnation of Jansenism, or would subscribe only with a qualification, on the ground that subscription implied internal assent and acquiescence. The less extreme party, though limiting the Church's infallibility to the question of dogma, thought that the formula might be signed absolutely and without qualification, on the ground that, by general usage, subscription implied assent to the dogma, but, in relation to the fact, only external reverence.

The meaning in a case of historical significance can be explained by a reference to the condemnation by Pope Innocent X of five propositions taken from the posthumous book of Jansenius, entitled Augustinus. Could the pope define that Jansenius really was the author of the book entitled Augustinus? No, he may speak of it as the work of Jansenius, because, in general repute, at least, it was regarded as the work of Jansenius. The precise authorship of a book is called a personal fact. The question turned on the doctrine of the book. The Jansenists admitted that the doctrine enunciated in the condemned propositions was heretical; but they maintained that the condemned doctrine was not taught in the Augustinus. This brings us to what are called "particular facts of doctrine". Thus, it is a fact (in this sense) that God exists, and that there are Three Persons in God; here the same thing is fact and dogma. The Jansenists admitted that the pope is competent to deal with particular facts of doctrine, but not to determine the meaning of a book. The controversy was then carried to the meaning of the book.

The pope cannot define the purely internal, subjective, perhaps singular meaning, which an author might attach to his words. But the pope, in certain cases, can determine the meaning of a book judged by the general laws of interpretation. And when a book or propositions from a book are condemned, "in the sense of the author", they are condemned in the sense in which the book or propositions would be understood when interpreted according to the ordinary laws of language. The same formula may be condemned in one author and not in another, because, interpreted by the context and general argument of the author, it may be unorthodox in one case and not in another. In the strict sense, therefore, a dogmatic fact may be defined as "the orthodox or heterodox meaning of a book or proposition"; or as a "fact that is so connected with dogma that a knowledge of the fact is necessary for teaching and conserving sound doctrine". That a book contains unorthodox doctrine, conveys that a certain doctrine is unorthodox; here we have close connection between fact and dogma.

Other Views 
Some theologians hold that definitions of dogmatic facts, and especially of dogmatic facts in the wider acceptation of the term, are believed by divine faith. For instance, the proposition, "every pope duly elected is the successor of Peter", is formally revealed. Other theologians hold that the definitions of dogmatic facts, in the wider and stricter acceptation, are received, not by divine faith, but by ecclesiastical faith, which some call mediate divine faith. They hold that in such syllogisms as this: "Every duly elected pontiff is Peter's successor; but Pius X, for example, is a duly elected pontiff; therefore he is a successor of Peter", the conclusion is not formally revealed by God, but is inferred from a revealed and an unrevealed proposition, and that consequently it is believed, not by divine, but by ecclesiastical faith. These may or may not be in accord with how the Church ultimately has clarified the teaching, which is that dogmatic facts are doctrines de fide tenenda, set forth infallibly and to be held definitively by all faithful Catholics.

References

Catholic theology and doctrine
Dogma